Byberry Creek is a  tributary of Poquessing Creek in northeastern Philadelphia, Pennsylvania in the United States.

Byberry Creek is formed from two branches that flow through Northeast Philadelphia, Wilsons Run and Waltons Run. 
 Waltons Run, the western stream, flows across land of the Northeast Philadelphia Airport.
 Wilsons Run, the eastern stream, is sometimes considered a continuation of the main stream Byberry Creek.

The two tributaries join to form the main channel of Byberry Creek near Academy Road adjacent to Archbishop Ryan High School as seen in aerial images of the area at coordinates .

Byberry Creek joins Poquessing Creek approximately one mile before the confluence with the Delaware River.

See also
List of rivers of Pennsylvania

References

External links 
 Friends of Poquessing Watershed - a local watershed conservation group

Rivers of Pennsylvania
Tributaries of the Delaware River
Rivers of Philadelphia